Gemma is an Italian female name, of Latin origin, meaning "gem" or "precious stone".

People with the given name

Female
 Gemma Arterton (born 1986), English actress
 Gemma Atkinson (born 1984), English actress and model
 Gemma Beadsworth (born 1987), Australian water polo player
 Gemma Bissix (born 1983), English actress
 Gemma Bond (born 1982), English ballet dancer
 Gemma Booth (born 1974), English photographer
 Gemma Chan (born 1982), British actress
 Gemma Collins (born 1981), English media personality and businesswoman
 Gemma Cowling, Australian model
 Gemma Craven (born 1950), Irish actress
 Gemma di Manetto Donati, the wife of medieval Italian poet Dante Alighieri
 Gemma Doyle (politician) (born 1981), British Labour Party politician
 Gemma Frizelle (born 1998), British rhythmic gymnast
 Gemma Galgani or Saint Gemma of Lucca (1878–1903), Italian mystic with signs of stigmata, venerated in the Roman Catholic Church as a saint
 Gemma Geis (born 1979), Catalan politician
 Gemma Hayes (born 1977), Irish singer-songwriter
 Gemma Houghton (born 1993), Australian rules footballer
 Gemma Hunt (born 1982), English children's TV presenter
 Gemma Jackson (born 1951), British production designer
 Gemma Jones (born 1942), English actress
 Gemma Mengual (born 1977), Catalan synchronised swimmer
Gemma Peacocke, composer from New Zealand
 Gemma Sanderson (born 1983), Australian model and the winner of Australia's Next Top Model, Cycle 1
Gemma Smith (born 1978), Australian painter and sculptor
 Gemma Ward (born 1987), Australian model
 Gemma Whelan (born 1981), English actress and comedian

Male
 Gemma Frisius (1508–1555), Frisian mathematician, cartographer and instrument maker

Fictional characters
 Gemma, in the first series of the Sky One supernatural TV series Hex
 Gemma, in the children's Hospital Radio series The Space Gypsy Adventures
 Gemma, in the 2023 sci-fi horror film M3GAN
Gemma Ball, a character in the television series Shameless
 Gemma Bovery, a character in the film Gemma Bovery
 Gemma Doyle, heroine of Libba Bray's novels A Great and Terrible Beauty, Rebel Angels, and The Sweet Far Thing; see List of Gemma Doyle Trilogy characters
Gemma Foster, the main character in the British series Doctor Foster
 Gemma Larson, a character in the ABC series Grey’s Anatomy
 Gemma Nerrick, a character in the Netflix mockumentaries Death to 2020 and Death to 2021
 Gemma Palmer, played by Felicity Kendal in Solo, a British sitcom
 Gemma Reeves, a character from the Australian soap opera Neighbours
 Gemma T., a character in the Stephen King novel Doctor Sleep
 Gemma Teller Morrow, a character in the FX TV series Sons of Anarchy
Gemma Simmons, a character in the Marvel Television series Agents of Shield
 Gemma Warren, heroine of the 1897 novel The Gadfly
 Gemma Winter, a character from the British soap opera Coronation Street

See also 
 
 Gema (given name)
 Emma (given name)
 Jemma (given name)
 Gemma (surname)

References

External links 

English feminine given names
Irish feminine given names
Italian feminine given names
Scottish feminine given names
Welsh feminine given names